Chenar (also Romanized as Chenār) is a village in Sar Firuzabad Rural District, Firuzabad District, Kermanshah County, Kermanshah Province, Iran. According to the 2006 census, its population was 29, in 5 families.

References 

Populated places in Kermanshah County